These are the official results of the Men's 3000 metres steeplechase event at the 1999 IAAF World Championships in Seville, Spain. There were a total number of 40 participating athletes, with three qualifying heats and the final held on Monday 1999-08-23 at 21:10h.

Final

Heats
Held on Saturday 1999-08-21

References
 

H
Steeplechase at the World Athletics Championships